Paulus “Paul” Dielemans (born 4 January 1957) is a Dutch Antillean sailor. He competed in the Laser event at the 1996 Summer Olympics.

References

External links
 

1957 births
Living people
Dutch Antillean  male sailors (sport)
Olympic sailors of the Netherlands Antilles
Sailors at the 1996 Summer Olympics – Laser
Place of birth missing (living people)